Molkan is a village in Sardasht Rural District, in the Central District of Bashagard County, Hormozgan Province, Iran. At the 2006 census, its population was 571, in 101 families.

References 

Populated places in Bashagard County